This article contains a list of '''named passenger trains in Australia.

Australia is the only continent to offer both east-west and north-south transcontinental trains: The Indian Pacific from Sydney on the Pacific to Perth on the Indian Oceans, and The Ghan from Adelaide on the southern shores of the continent to Darwin on the northern shore.

See also
List of named trains in Victoria

References

Named passenger trains
Australia